Phander is the name of a settlement and valley in the Gupis-Yasin District located in Gilgit−Baltistan, Pakistan. It is situated about 184 Kilometers from Gilgit on the road to the Shandur Pass, which continues on to Chitral.

It is well known locally that there is a reason for naming this valley Phander, as "Phan" means palm in the local Khowar language and this place is flat like a palm, hence it was called Phander.
This place is a tourist attraction. There are four lakes in this small valley, of which the Phander Lake is the largest.
Phander is one of the few places where the Gilgit River divides into several strands as it enters the valley, which merge again upon exit from the valley.

References

Gupis-Yasin District